is a former member of the Japanese idol groups AKB48 and SDN48.

References

1988 births
Japanese idols
Living people
21st-century Japanese singers
AKB48 members
SDN48 members
21st-century Japanese women singers